The Verner JCV 360 is a Czech aircraft engine, designed and built by Verner Motor of Šumperk for use in ultralight aircraft.

Design and development
The engine is a twin cylinder, horizontally-opposed four-stroke, liquid-cooled, gasoline engine design, with a poly V belt reduction drive with reduction ratio of 2.76:1. It employs a single electronic ignition and produces  at 7800 rpm.

The engine was still advertised for sale on the company website in 2013, but by 2015 was no longer listed as available and it is likely that production has ended.

Applications
Airsport Song
North Wing Maverick
Spacek SD-1 Minisport
TechProAviation Merlin 100

Specifications (JCV 360)

See also

References

External links
Photo of the JCV 360

Verner aircraft engines
1990s aircraft piston engines
Boxer engines